Winchelsea is a town in East Sussex, England.

Winchelsea may also refer to:

Places
 Winchelsea, Victoria, Australia, a town
 Winchelsea (UK Parliament constituency)
 Shire of Winchelsea, a former local government area around the Australian town

Railway stations
 Winchelsea railway station, serving the English town
 Winchelsea railway station, Victoria, serving the Australian town

Ships
 , an East Indiaman
 , various ships of Britain's Royal Navy

Other
 Winchelsea Football & Netball Club, Victoria, Australia